Taylortown is an unincorporated community in Bossier Parish, Louisiana, United States. Taylortown is located at a junction of US-71, La- 527, and Ash Point road, between the Flat River and Red River, northeast of Moon, Walson, and Old River Lakes.

It is part of the Shreveport - Bossier City Metropolitan Statistical Area and a suburb of Shreveport.

References 

Unincorporated communities in Louisiana
Populated places in Ark-La-Tex
Unincorporated communities in Bossier Parish, Louisiana
Unincorporated communities in Shreveport – Bossier City metropolitan area